The 2005 Northern Arizona Lumberjacks football team was an American football team that represented Northern Arizona University (NAU) as a member of the Big Sky Conference (Big Sky) during the 2005 NCAA Division I FCS football season. In their eighth year under head coach Jerome Souers, the Lumberjacks compiled a 3–8 record (1–7 against conference opponents), were outscored by a total of 338 to 233, and finished in a tie for last place in the Big Sky.

The team played its home games at the J. Lawrence Walkup Skydome, commonly known as the Walkup Skydome, in Flagstaff, Arizona.

Schedule

References

Northern Arizona
Northern Arizona Lumberjacks football seasons
Northern Arizona Lumberjacks football